The Dogras or Dogra people, are an Indo-Aryan ethno-linguistic group living primarily in India and also in the neighbouring Pakistan, consisting of the Dogri language speakers. They live predominantly in the Jammu region of Jammu and Kashmir, and in adjoining areas of Punjab and Himachal Pradesh. Some also live in northeastern Pakistan. Their historical homeland is known as Duggar.

Dogra Rajputs of the Jamwal clan ruled Jammu from the 19th century, when Gulab Singh was made a hereditary Raja of Jammu by Ranjit Singh, whilst his brother Dhian Singh was the empire's prime minister of Punjab, until October 1947. Through the Treaty of Amritsar (1846), they acquired Kashmir as well. 
The Dogra Regiment of the Indian Army primarily consists of Dogras from the Himachal Pradesh, Punjab and Jammu region.

Etymology
The term Dogra is thought to derive from Durgara, the name of a kingdom mentioned in an eleventh century copper-plate inscription in Chamba. The inscription mentions the Raja of Chamba facing an attack by Kiras aided by the Lord of Durgara (durgāreśwara). In medieval times the term Durgara is believed to have turned into Duggar, eventually transforming to 'Dogra'. Kalhana's Rajatarangini makes no mention of a kingdom by any of these names, but the kingdoms could have been referred to by their capital cities (such as Vallapura, modern Billawar, or Babbapura, modern Babor). In modern times, the term Dogra has become an ethnic identity, referring to all who speak the Dogri language, irrespective of their religion.

History
Omachanda Handa believes that the Durgara people were originally migrants from Rajasthan. The allusion to durg (fort) in their name indicates that they may have remained a warrior people, eventually founding powerful kingdoms between Chenab and Ravi, and possibly dominating up to the Sutluj river.

According to archaeologist M. A. Stein, there were some eleven Dogra states in the region, all of them eventually absorbed into the Jammu state, which emerged as the most powerful. Prior to the rise of Jammu, Babbapura (Babor) is believed to have been the chief state of Dogras. Lying 45 km east of Jammu, Babor contains the ruins of six magnificent temples representing a "thriving artistic activity". The Rajatarangini mentions Raja Vajradhara of Babbapura vowing allegiance to Bhikshachara of Kashmir in 1120 AD, along with the chiefs of neighbouring kingdoms.

Jammu Dogras
The Jammu Dogras traditionally inhabited the area between the slopes of the Shivalik range of mountains and the sacred Surinsar Lake and Mansar Lake, but later spread over whole of the Jammu region. Many of the dogras immigrated from the state of Punjab, specifically from Sialkot region. They generally speak Dogri and other dialects similar to Dogri or western Pahadi-influenced languages. The majority of the Dogra are followers of Hinduism, but many in Jammu and Kashmir believe in other religions. In the sixteenth and seventeenth centuries, some Dogras embraced Islam and Sikhism. These factors, together with the effects of immigration into the region, have resulted in the Dogra population of Jammu and Kashmir including members of all three religions.

The Dogra dynasty emerged as a regional power, particularly after Rajput Maharaja Gulab Singh emerged as a warrior and his subjects received special martial recognition from the British Raj. The rule of Gulab Singh's Raj extended over the whole of the Jammu region, a large part of the Ladakh region as early as March 1846, and a large part of the Indian Punjab (now Himachal Pradesh). The Kashmir Valley was handed over to Gulab Singh by the British government, as part of the territories ceded to the British government by Lahore State according to the provisions of Article IV of the Treaty of Lahore dated 9March 1846. Under the Treaty of Amritsar in the same year, the Dogra king of Jammu and the state was thereafter known as the Maharaja of Jammu and Kashmir State (Raj), also thereafter referred as Kashmir State. The term Dogra hence is more akin to the subjects of Himachal Pradesh, some areas of Punjab and the whole region of Jammu that was ruled by Raja Gulab Singh as part of the Dogra Raj irrespective of the religion of the inhabitants.

Jammu and Kashmir 

The Dogra dynasty was a dynasty of Hindu Rajputs who ruled Jammu & Kashmir from 1846 to 1947. They traced their ancestry to the Ikshvaku (Solar) Dynasty of Northern India (the same clan in which Lord Rama was born; he, therefore, is the 'kuldevta' (family deity) of the Dogras).

The Sikh Empire rule extended beyond the Jammu region and the Kashmir Valley to the Tibetan Buddhist Kingdom of Ladakh and the Emirates of Hunza, Gilgit and Nagar. After the First Anglo-Sikh War in 1846, the British gave Kashmir and the title of 'Maharaja' to Gulab Singh – the chief minister –  as a reward for aligning with them against the Sikhs.

Military history
The Dogra Regiment was among the regiments of the British Indian Army, which made significant contributions in both the world wars on all fronts from East Asia to Europe and North Africa. At Independence, it became an infantry regiment of the Indian Army composed largely but not exclusively of the Dogra people. The Jammu and Kashmir Rifles, another regiment of the Indian Army, consisting of mainly Dogras was formed out of the former army of the Kingdom of Jammu & Kashmir after it was absorbed into the Indian Army.

Culture

Folk dance and music
 Kud, a ritual dance performed in honour of Lok Devatas. This dance style is performed mostly at night. It is spontaneous and people of all ages and genders participate. The rhythm of music controls the movement of participants. This dance continues  all night. The number of participants ranges from 20 to 30.
 Heren, a traditional theatre form performed during the Lohri festival by 10–15 people. It is mostly performed in the hills of Jammu, Udhampur and ramnagar.
 Fumenie and Jagarana, a dance style performed by women on the eve of a groom's departure to in-laws house. Both songs are sung by a group of 15–20 members. This traditional dance form depicts the feelings and emotions of women.
 Paakh/Gwatri/Kark/Masade, a chorus narrative sung by a group of 10 singers without any musical instruments.
 Gwatri, a song–dance combined tradition in which the singers narrate some text which is acted by the Gwatari dancers.
 Karak, a narrative ballet sung by a community called 'Jogies'. They narrate a popular folk tale in their dance style, performed by three members to the accompaniment of a folk instrument called a rubab.
 Benthe, a chorus singing tradition performed by a specific community of tribal people called Gujjar and Bakerwal. The dance is performed by 5–7 members.

Cuisine

Wheat, maize and bajra are staple foods, in addition to rice, cereals and a tangy preparation of mango or tamarind popularly known as ambal (अम्बल) or maani (म्हाणी)/ambal (अंबल). The dish is called dal patt maani (दाल भत्त म्हाणी) and is savoured as a combination. Mittha madra (मिट्ठा मदरा) is a favourite and is made with milk, dry fruit, and semolina. 

Especially in ceremonial cooking, the following are favorites:  
preparations of rajmash (a special variety of red kidney beans)
mash da madra (yogurt-based gravy for black lentils)
auryia, a curd dish fermented by rye
kulth di daal (horse gram) *ambal made from pumpkin, jaggery and tamarind.

Expert cooks are usually Dogra Jheer. Kalari is milk preserved by the coagulation of proteins, then fried in a pan.

Non-vegetarian food was limited to Rajputs and Vaish (Mahajans). Khatta meat is mutton cooked with sour pomegranate seeds (anardana) or lime juice and flavoured with fumes of a burning charcoal soaked in mustard oil. Keyur (घ्यूर) is a well-known Dogra food. It is prepared by frying flour or maida batter, and served with sugar and curd. Mostly, it is served to bridegrooms at the time of marriage by his in-laws. Kalari is a favourite food of Dogras in the rainy season. It is prepared by mixing flour, cottage cheese and milk cream (malai) with water with help of a small cup-shaped pot. Kalari is served with milk. Kalari cheese is popular in the Jammu region and in Jammu and Kashmir state more generally. Babbru/pathoru are prepared with flour and fried in oil. Babbru is served with maani/potato dish/kheer/curd etc. 

Kheer is a dish prepared from milk by adding rice and dry fruit. It is served at all special occasions and festivals. Another popular exotic dish is guchiyyan (dried black morel), usually added as an ingredient in pulao. As it grows naturally in forests and cannot be cultivated, it is a priced commodity (approx 500 Rs. per 100 g) and makes an excelled dish with mountain potatoes (pahadi aloo). Saffron or kesar is extensively used to flavour sweet dishes and for its anti-oxidant benefits. Many types of pickles are prepared with Kasrod (fiddlehead fern), mango, tyaoo, lasoode and girgle.

Notable Dogras
 
 

 Banda Singh Bahadur, Sikh warrior and commander of Khalsa army
 Premchand Degra - Indian bodybuilder from Punjab region
 Hans Raj Dogra, Indian politician
 Monica Dogra – singer and actor
 Paras Dogra – cricketer who plays for Rajasthan Royals 
 Prem Nath Dogra – founder of J&K Praja Parishad and later All India President of Bhartiya Jana Sangh
 Ridhi Dogra - actress
 Tirath Das Dogra – former director All India Institute of Medical Sciences, forensic medicine expert, vice-chancellor of SGT University. Member of Medical Council of India.
 Mian Dido Jamwal (1780-1821)- Military and political figures during 18 and 19 century.
 Ranveer Jamwal - Mountaineer
 Vidyut Jammwal  - actor
 Ajay Singh Jasrotia - Martyr of Kargil War 1999
 Zorawar Singh Kahluria - Military General of first Khalsa and later Dogra rulers of Jammu.
 Captain Saurabh Kalia, Kargil War hero
 Chaudhry Muhammad Sarwar Khan (1919-2003) Longest Serving Pakistani Parliamentarian from Rupochak, District Narowal/Sialkot
 Sargam Koushal - Mrs. World 2022
 Vijay Mahajan - Former Dean (Indian School of Business), Distinguished Professor at the McCombs School of Business, The University of Texas at Austin
 Manjit Minhas - Canadian entrepreneur
 Alla Rakha – Padma Shri awardee and tabla player.
 Mehta Basti Ram, Commander
 Mukesh Rishi - actor
 Major Somnath Sharma – First recipient of the Param Vir Chakra
 Bhim Singh – Leader of the JKNPP, Ex General Secretary of the All India Congress Committee and international activist for secular democratic value

References

Bibliography 
 
 
 

 
Ethnic groups in Pakistan
Ethnic groups in India
Himalayan peoples
Indo-Aryan peoples
Indian surnames
Linguistic groups of the constitutionally recognised official languages of India
Social groups of India
Social groups of Pakistan
Social groups of Jammu and Kashmir